Pandanguo is a settlement in Kenya's Lamu County.

History
On July 5, 2017, al-Shabaab militants attacked a police station in Pandanguo, killing three officers.

References 

Populated places in Coast Province
Lamu County